Todd Woodbridge and Mark Woodforde defeated Paul Haarhuis and Sandon Stolle in the final, 6–3, 6–4, 6–1, to win the gentlemen's doubles title at the 2000 Wimbledon Championships. It was their sixth Wimbledon title and eleventh and last major title overall, though Woodbridge would go on to win the title a further three times partnering Jonas Björkman.

Mahesh Bhupathi and Leander Paes were the defending champions, but Paes did not compete. Bhupathi partnered with David Prinosil but lost in the third round to Roger Federer and Andrew Kratzmann.

This marked Haarhuis' fourth consecutive final with the third partner change in a row.

Seeds

  Todd Woodbridge /  Mark Woodforde (champions)
  Paul Haarhuis /  Sandon Stolle (final)
  Alex O'Brien /  Jared Palmer (quarterfinals)
  Ellis Ferreira /  Rick Leach (quarterfinals)
  Jonas Björkman /  Byron Black (third round)
  David Adams /  John-Laffnie de Jager (semifinals)
  Martin Damm /  Wayne Ferreira (second round)
  Jiří Novák /  David Rikl (third round)
  Sébastien Lareau /  Daniel Nestor (quarterfinals)
  Mahesh Bhupathi /  David Prinosil (third round)
  Nicklas Kulti /  Mikael Tillström (semifinals)
  Wayne Black /  Kevin Ullyett (first round)
  Donald Johnson /  Piet Norval (second round)
  Justin Gimelstob /  Mark Knowles (third round)
  Joshua Eagle /  Andrew Florent (second round)
  Tomás Carbonell /  Martín García (first round)

Qualifying

Draw

Finals

Top half

Section 1

Section 2

Bottom half

Section 3

Section 4

References

External links

2000 Wimbledon Championships – Men's draws and results at the International Tennis Federation

Men's Doubles
Wimbledon Championship by year – Men's doubles